The Central District of Rostam County is a district (bakhsh) in Rostam County, Fars Province, Iran. At the 2006 census, its population was 26,746, in 5,596 families.  The District has one city: Masiri. The District has two rural districts (dehestan): Rostam-e Do Rural District and Rostam-e Yek Rural District.

References 

Rostam County
Districts of Fars Province